is a 　mountain, located on the border of Nose, Osaka and Nantan, Kyoto, Japan.

Outline 
Mount Miyama is the tallest mountain of Hokusetsu Mountains. This mountain is one of Osaka 50 mountains, and a part of Hokusetsu Natural Park.

Route 

There are three major routes to the top of this mountain. One is from Okururi Valley and it takes one hour and 50 minutes to the top of the mountain. Second one is from Hirono, and it takes two hours 50 minutes. The last one is from Fukuzumi, in Sasayama, Hyōgo and it takes two and half hours.

Access 
 Okururikei Bus Stop of Chukyo Bus
 Hirono Bus Stop of Chukyo Bus
 Fukuzumi Bus Stop of Shinki Bus

Gallery

References
 Hokusetsu, Kyoto Nishiyama, Shobunsha, 2007
 Official Home Page of the Geographical Survey Institute in Japan

Mount Miyama
Mount Miyama